The Danish Junior Curling Championships are the national championships of men's and women's junior curling teams in Denmark. Junior level curlers must be under the age of 21. The championships have been held annually since 1976 for junior men and since 1983 for junior women. The championships are organized by the Danish Curling Association.

Past champions
Teams line-ups in order: fourth, third, second, lead, alternate; skips marked bold.

Men

Women

References

See also
Danish Men's Curling Championship
Danish Women's Curling Championship
Danish Mixed Doubles Curling Championship
Danish Mixed Curling Championship

Curling competitions in Denmark
National curling championships
Recurring sporting events established in 1976
1976 establishments in Denmark
Recurring sporting events established in 1983
1983 establishments in Denmark
Annual sporting events in Denmark
Youth sport in Denmark
National youth sports competitions
Youth curling